In mathematics, Abel's inequality, named after Niels Henrik Abel, supplies a simple bound on the absolute value of the inner product of two vectors in an important special case.

Mathematical description
Let {a1, a2,...} be a sequence of real numbers that is either nonincreasing or nondecreasing, and let {b1, b2,...} be a sequence of real or complex numbers. 
If {an} is nondecreasing, it holds that

and if {an} is nonincreasing, it holds that

where

In particular, if the sequence  is nonincreasing and nonnegative, it follows that

Relation to Abel's transformation
Abel's inequality follows easily from Abel's transformation, which is the discrete version of integration by parts: If

References
 
 Abel's inequality in Encyclopedia of Mathematics.

Inequalities
Niels Henrik Abel